Qasim Akram (born 1st December 2002) is a Pakistani cricketer. 

An all-rounder who's primarily a batsman who can bowl off-spin, he considers former Pakistan international player Mohammad Hafeez to be his role-model.

Early and youth career
Qasim was born in Abbotabad but learned his cricket in Lahore, joining the city's Riazuddin Cricket Academy before playing at club level and then at Under-16. He'd then perform in the Under-19s at the district level for Lahore in 2018 and then at the national level in 2019, when he'll be selected for the 2019 ACC Under-19 Asia Cup.

In December 2019, he was named in Pakistan's squad for the 2020 Under-19 Cricket World Cup. 

In April 2021, he was named as the captain of the Pakistan under-19 team, ahead of their tour of Bangladesh. 

In December 2021, he was named as the captain of Pakistan's team for the 2022 ICC Under-19 Cricket World Cup in the West Indies. 

In February 2022, in the fifth-place play-off match in the Under-19 Cricket World Cup, Qasim became the first player to score a century and take a five-wicket haul in a Youth ODI match.

Domestic career
In September 2020, he made his Twenty20 debut for Central Punjab in the 2020–21 National T20 Cup. 

In October 2020, he made his first-class debut, also for Central Punjab, in the 2020–21 Quaid-e-Azam Trophy. 

In December 2020, he was shortlisted as one of the Men's Emerging Cricketer of the Year for the 2020 PCB Awards.

In January 2021, he was named in Central Punjab's squad for the 2020–21 Pakistan Cup. He made his List A debut for Central Punjab few days later. During the tournament, he scored his first century in List A cricket, with an unbeaten 108 runs.

In December 2021, he was signed by the Karachi Kings following the players' draft for the 2022 Pakistan Super League.

International career
In October 2021, he was named in the Pakistan Shaheens squad for their tour of Sri Lanka.

References

External links
 

2002 births
Living people
Pakistani cricketers
Central Punjab cricketers
Karachi Kings cricketers
People from Abbottabad